Tanith  may refer to:

Mythology 
 Tanith, alternative spelling of Tanit, an ancient Carthaginian lunar goddess of the Phoenician pantheon

People 
Tanith (DJ) (born 1962), stage name of Thomas Andrezak, German DJ and producer of electronic dance music
Tanith Belbin (born 1984), Canadian/American figure skater
Tanith Carey (born 1967), British author and journalist
Tanith Lee (1947–2015), British author
Tanith Maxwell (born 1976), South African runner
Tanit Phoenix (born 1984), South African fashion model and actress

Fictional characters 
 Tanith (Stargate), a male Goa'uld from Stargate SG-1
 Tanith Carlisle, a leading character in The Devil Rides Out by Dennis Wheatley
 Tanith, a secondary character in The World of Lone Wolf gamebook series
 Tanith Low, a character in the Skulduggery Pleasant series of novels by Derek Landy
 Tanith, the deputy commander of Begnion's Holy Guard from Fire Emblem: Path of Radiance and Fire Emblem: Radiant Dawn

Fictional locations 
 Tanith (CoDominium), a planet in the CoDominium series of science fiction stories by Jerry Pournelle and others
 Tanith, a planet in the novel Space Viking by H. Beam Piper
 Tanith (Gaunt's Ghosts), the former homeworld of the Tanith First-and-Only, who are the subject of the Gaunt's Ghosts novels by Dan Abnett
 Tanith, a planet in David Brin's Uplift Universe

Other uses 
 5869 Tanith, an Amor asteroid discovered in 1988 by Carolyn S. Shoemaker

English-language feminine given names